US Post Office-Jamaica Main is a historic post office building located at the northwest corner of 164th Street and 89th Avenue in Jamaica in Queens County, New York, United States. It serves the 11432 ZIP Code. It was built in 1932–1934, and is one of two post offices in New York City designed by the architects Cross & Cross as a consultant to the Office of the Supervising Architect.  The building is a two-story brick building on a light gray granite base with marble trim in the Colonial Revival style.  It features a handsome marble portico supported by four Ionic order columns.

The building in 2007 was renamed in honor of Clarence L. Irving
It was listed on the National Register of Historic Places in 1988.

References

External links
Map and Business Hours - USPS website

Jamaica Main
Government buildings completed in 1934
Colonial Revival architecture in New York City
Government buildings in Queens, New York
Jamaica, Queens
National Register of Historic Places in Queens, New York
1934 establishments in New York City